This is an alphabetical list of notable Mexican actors.

A 

Alfredo Adame
Rafael Amaya
Armando Araiza
Raúl Araiza
Raúl Araiza (director)
Alexis Ayala

B 

Kuno Becker
Augusto Benedico
Bruno Bichir
Demián Bichir
Odiseo Bichir
Victorio Blanco
Hector Bonilla
Claudio Brook

C 

Alejandro Camacho
Jaime Camil
Eduardo Capetillo
Guillermo Capetillo
René Casados
Fernando Ciangherotti
Fernando Colunga
Joaquín Cordero

D 

Leonardo Daniel
Arath de la Torre
Eric del Castillo
Aarón Díaz

E 

José Ángel Espinoza
Alberto Estrella

F 

Emilio Fernández
Pedro Fernández
Juan Ferrara
Omar Fierro

G 

Andrés García
Sergio Goyri
Rogelio Guerra
Jorge Antonio Guerrero

I 

Mauricio Islas

J 

Sergio Jiménez

L 

Ernesto Laguardia
Imanol Landeta
Manuel Landeta
Valentino Lanús
Sebastián Ligarde
Ariel Lopez Padilla
Ignacio Lopez Tarso
Diego Luna

M 

Armando Manzanero
Jorge Martinez Colorado
Ricardo Montalbán
Pablo Montero

N 

Victor Noriega

O 

Manuel Ojeda

P 

Roberto Palazuelos
Eduardo Palomo
Arturo Peniche
Salvador Pineda
Jorge Poza

Q 

Anthony Quinn

R 

Adal Ramones
Fabián Robles
José Ron
Manuel Garcia-Rulfo

S 

Jorge Salinas
Eduardo Santamarina
Manuel Saval
Diego Schoening
Héctor Soberón
Gabriel Soto

T 

Ari Telch
José María Torre

V 

Eduardo Verastegui

Y 

Eduardo Yañez

Z 

David Zepeda
Humberto Zurita
Sebastian Zurita

See also
 List of Mexican actresses

References

Lists of actors by nationality